The Temptation of Eileen Hughes, published in 1981, is a novel by Northern Irish-Canadian writer Brian Moore. It portrays a quiet young shop assistant from Northern Ireland and her relationship with her rich employers Bernard and Mona McAuley who take her on a trip to London.

Joyce Carol Oates in The New York Times, while appreciating the qualities of Moore's earlier novels, was critical of this one for being "so sketchy, anemic and hurried that one is led to wonder what has gone amiss. For not only is character largely unexplored here – and humor absent – but Mr. Moore tells his story in so perfunctory a manner that it is as if he is merely going through the motions of a narrative this time."

Television adaptation
A TV film based on the novel was made by the BBC and broadcast in the United Kingdom on 3 April 1988. Directed by Tristram Powell, it starred Angharad Rees, Ethna Roddy and Mary Duddy.

External links 
 Internet Movie Database entry for The Temptation of Eileen Hughes film

References 

1981 British novels
1981 Canadian novels
1988 films
1988 television films
Canadian novels adapted into films
Canadian novels adapted into television shows
Films based on novels by Brian Moore
Irish novels adapted into films
Irish novels adapted into television shows
British novels adapted into television shows
Novels by Brian Moore (novelist)
Novels set in London
Novels set in Northern Ireland
Works by Brian Moore (novelist)